East Pennsboro Township is a township in Cumberland County, Pennsylvania, United States. The population was 20,228 at the 2010 census, up from 18,254 at the 2000 census. East Pennsboro is the second most populous municipality in Cumberland County. The township is located along the western banks of the Susquehanna River, across from Harrisburg. There are many large corporations based in East Pennsboro Township that use the Camp Hill postal address, including the Rite Aid Corporation and Gannett Fleming.

Geography
The township is in the northeast corner of Cumberland County, bordered to the east by the Susquehanna River, which separates it from Dauphin County. The township's natural northern boundary is the crest of Blue Mountain, which separates it from Perry County. U.S. Route 11/U.S. Route 15 parallels the Susquehanna as the main north-to-south route in the township, and east-to-west Pennsylvania Route 944 meets it in West Fairview. Interstate 81 crosses its northern tier and interchanges with US 11/US 15 in Summerdale. Other local roads of note are Center Street/East Penn Drive, North Enola Drive, Salt Road, and Valley Road. Conodoguinet Creek makes several large bends across the southern part of the township before entering the Susquehanna between West Fairview and Wormleysburg.

Unincorporated communities and census-designated places in East Pennsboro Township:
Enola
Summerdale
West Enola
West Fairview

Neighboring municipalities
Hampden Township (west)
Camp Hill (south)
Lemoyne (southeast)
Wormleysburg (southeast)
Harrisburg, Dauphin County (east)
Susquehanna Township, Dauphin County (northeast)
Marysville, Perry County (north)
Rye Township, Perry County (north)

Climate
East Pennsboro has a hot-summer humid continental climate (Dfa) and the hardiness zones are 7a and 6b. Average monthly temperatures in West Fairview range from 30.2 °F in January to 75.2 °F in July.  The average annual absolute minimum temperature in West Fairview is 0.3 °F.

Demographics
As of the census of 2000, there were 18,254 people, 7,475 households, and 4,970 families residing in the township.  The population density was 1,673.9 people per square mile (646.0/km).  There were 7,804 housing units at an average density of 715.6/sq mi (276.2/km).  The racial makeup of the township was 93.74% White, 1.47% African American, 0.14% Native American, 2.53% Asian, 0.03% Pacific Islander, 0.64% from other races, and 1.46% from two or more races. Hispanic or Latino of any race were 1.54% of the population.

There were 7,475 households, out of which 29.5% had children under the age of 18 living with them, 53.7% were married couples living together, 9.4% had a female householder with no husband present, and 33.5% were non-families. 27.8% of all households were made up of individuals, and 10.3% had someone living alone who was 65 years of age or older.  The average household size was 2.38 and the average family size was 2.91.

In the township the population was spread out, with 22.7% under the age of 18, 8.1% from 18 to 24, 31.5% from 25 to 44, 24.1% from 45 to 64, and 13.5% who were 65 years of age or older.  The median age was 38 years. For every 100 females, there were 90.6 males.  For every 100 females age 18 and over, there were 87.7 males.

The median income for a household in the township was $44,473, and the median income for a family was $54,142. Males had a median income of $36,732 versus $27,542 for females. The per capita income for the township was $22,517.  About 3.9% of families and 6.7% of the population were below the poverty line, including 7.3% of those under age 18 and 9.6% of those age 65 or over.

Education
East Pennsboro Township is served by the East Pennsboro Area School District. In addition, the Central Pennsylvania College is located in East Pennsboro Township.

Culture

Events 
Annually, the township hosts a fair called Pumpkinfest in the fall. In June of each year, the East Pennsboro Emergency Services hosts a carnival

References

External links

 East Pennsboro Township official website

Harrisburg–Carlisle metropolitan statistical area
Townships in Cumberland County, Pennsylvania
Townships in Pennsylvania